BlackBerry is a 2023 Canadian biopic film about the history of the BlackBerry line of mobile phones. It is directed by Matt Johnson from a script by Johnson and producer Matthew Miller, which was adapted from Jacquie McNish and Sean Silcoff’s book Losing the Signal: The Untold Story Behind the Extraordinary Rise and Spectacular Fall of BlackBerry, and stars Jay Baruchel and Glenn Howerton in the lead roles as Mike Lazaridis and Jim Balsillie, respectively. It also stars Johnson, Rich Sommer, Michael Ironside, Martin Donovan, Michelle Giroux, SungWon Cho, Saul Rubinek, and Cary Elwes.

BlackBerry premiered in competition at the 73rd Berlin International Film Festival on February 17, 2023. The film will be released in Canada on May 12, 2023.

Cast
 Jay Baruchel as Mike Lazaridis 
 Glenn Howerton as Jim Balsillie
 Cary Elwes as Carl Yankowski
 Saul Rubinek as John Woodman
 Michael Ironside as Charles Purdy
 Rich Sommer as Paul Stannos
 SungWon Cho as Ritchie Cheung
 Michelle Giroux as Dara Frankel
 Matt Johnson as Douglas Fregin

Production 

In August 2022, the film was announced after it had wrapped production.

Release
BlackBerry premiered in competition at the 73rd Berlin International Film Festival on February 17, 2023. IFC Films acquired the rights to distribute the film in the United States, with Paramount Global Content Distribution acquiring multiple international territories for distribution. The film will be released in Canada on May 12, 2023, by Elevation Pictures.

Reception 
On Rotten Tomatoes, the film has an approval rating of 100% based on 12 reviews, with an average rating of 7.8/10. On Metacritic, the film has a weighted average score of 83 out of 100, based on 10 critics, indicating "universal acclaim".

References

External links

2023 films
2023 comedy-drama films
Canadian comedy-drama films
2020s English-language films
English-language Canadian films
2020s Canadian films